Dead Set is a British zombie horror miniseries written and created by Charlie Brooker and directed by Yann Demange. The show takes place primarily on the set of a fictional series of the real television show Big Brother. The five episodes, aired over five consecutive nights, chronicle a zombie outbreak that strands the housemates and production staff inside the Big Brother House, which quickly becomes a shelter from the undead.

Dead Set is a production of Zeppotron, part of the Endemol group of production and distribution companies that produces the actual Big Brother. The series first aired on E4 starting on 27 October 2008, just six weeks after the end of Big Brother 2008 on the same channel.

Cast

Cameos by former Big Brother housemates

Episodes

Production

Writing
Charlie Brooker said that the basic idea for the series came about in 2004, as he watched the American series 24. He commented: "I'm enjoying this, but these terrorists are just ridiculous. They're like waves of Space Invaders. They might as well be zombies." Following this, he imagined an apocalypse occurring during the filming of Big Brother. He cited the Big Brother House as an excellent place to hide during a zombie apocalypse.

The first draft of the script was written in 2005, during the airing of Big Brother 6. He based some of his fictional housemates on actual former housemates. For example, he cited Maxwell Ward and Saskia Howard-Clarke as inspirations for Marky and Veronica, with Pippa and Space being loosely based on Helen Adams and Kieron "Science" Harvey respectively. For further inspiration, he attended the live eviction of George Galloway during Celebrity Big Brother 4, where he also visited the camera runs that surround the House.

Beyond Big Brother, Brooker noted several examples of zombie fiction that had inspired him, including the Dead series of films by George A. Romero, Zombie Flesh Eaters, 28 Days Later, The Walking Dead, The Living Dead At Manchester Morgue and Zombie Creeping Flesh.

Angela Jain, then head of E4 announced that she had commissioned the series in April 2008, although the true nature of the project was not publicly revealed until August of that year.

Filming
The Big Brother eye logo featured in Dead Set was described by Brooker as a combination of several of the real logos used throughout the series. The design of the fictional Big Brother set was made to look as authentic as possible - it featured similar cameras, two-way mirrors (which could be angled to avoid revealing the camera crew), astroturf and the actual (albeit slightly modified) Diary Room chair from Big Brother 8. Filming inside the fictional Big Brother set for the first episode was done using Digital Betacam technology, to retain the look and feel of the actual Big Brother series. The rest of the scenes were shot using the Arriflex D-20.

Filming for the series took place over the summer of 2008, mainly at Longcross Studios and the surrounding areas. The eviction of Pippa (Kathleen McDermott) was filmed at the actual Big Brother House in Elstree, on 18 July 2008 - the same night that Belinda was evicted. Before she left the house, McDermott was placed in the stairwell of the House, and "evicted" in front of the show's live audience. McDermott and Davina McCall had previously shot an improvised "eviction interview". In addition, several former Big Brother housemates appeared as themselves and were filmed chatting to each other as part of a fictional "reunion", before Dead Set'''s crew members "surprised" them in order to film a shocked reaction.

Scenes featuring McCall as a zombie were filmed in one day, and the bodies lying around the corridor during the scene were created with SFX dummies (besides Eugene Sully's, which McCall is seen feasting on). McCall stated that she was covered in bruises the next day, due to hammering on the door in several scenes. She based her zombie-running style on the T-1000 from the 1991 film Terminator 2: Judgment Day. As she was restricted to only one day's filming, a dummy of McCall was used in some scenes for which she was unavailable.

Filming of the series was found to be difficult, due to budgetary and time constraints. Some extras were redressed to play different zombies due to the cost of the contact lenses used as zombie eyes; and the scene in Episode 2 in which Alex and Riq's car breaks down was originally meant to be an explosive car crash. Brooker cited similar constraints as the reason for the elimination of his original concept for the final episode, which would have been set six months after the outbreak. Many of the zombies featured in the crowd scenes - including the final assault on the house - were volunteers recruited through the internet.

Charlie Brooker himself also has a brief cameo as a zombie in the second episode.

Release
Promotion

A map for the Borehamwood region, the site of the real Big Brother House, was added to the Urban Dead MMORPG - with a competition to win a copy of the DVD as part of the promotion of the series. A website for Dead Set was launched on 17 September 2008. There also was a viral marketing site at UnseenScreen.com which had a clip of an interruption to the Big Brother live feed. The website would ask for your name and date of birth to make sure you are 18 or over. This clip shows an unknown woman wearing a leather jacket and trousers trapped in a destroyed Diary Room, covered in blood. screaming for help. The sound cuts out for the majority of the video, only her screaming "Help me." and the name entered can be heard. She then turns to the wall behind her and struggles to write “Help me (Name)”, and the date of birth entered on the wall in blood. The video then goes to a card saying "Dead Set Coming Soon" with an address to the E4 Dead Set site. Advertisements for the show were aired on E4 and its parent, Channel 4, with a final trailer appearing on YouTube on 27 October.

Original broadcast
The series launched on E4 on 27 October 2008, and concluded on 31 October 2008. All five episodes were broadcast consecutively as a Halloween feature length (2.5 hours) version on E4 on 31 October 2009. Dead Set was repeated on Channel 4 from 6 to 8 January 2009, reformatted into three-hour-long episodes.

International broadcasts

Home media
The entire series was released on DVD on 3 November 2008, and again in a repackaged format on 19 October 2009. The running time for the DVD is 142 minutes. The DVD extras included interviews with the director, writer and cast, behind-the-scenes and special effects featurettes, and a selection of deleted and extended scenes, including:
 Pippa's eviction in full (featuring scenes shot from inside the actual Big Brother house staircase)
 A segment from a fictional episode of 8 Out of 10 Cats A scene featuring Patrick discussing "recycling" Grayson's body
 An extended version of Patrick mocking Veronica over her relationship with Marky
 Pippa's death in the final episode at the hands of her undead mother.

The series is currently available to stream in the UK, Canada and the US on Netflix.

ReceptionDead Set has been acclaimed by critics and the public alike. Metacritic assigned the series a weighted average score of 77 out of 100, based on 6 critics, indicating "generally favorable reviews". In 2009, it was nominated for a BAFTA for "Best Drama Serial", but lost out to Criminal Justice.

Simon Pegg, a co-writer and star of the zombie comedy film Shaun of the Dead, commented on Dead Set for The Guardian. While generally praising the series, he expressed dismay at the move away from the traditional slow zombies of the Romero films to the modern 'fast zombie' used in Dead Set which were akin to the infected from 28 Days Later or the zombies from the 2004 Dawn of the Dead remake. Brooker responded that this was due to a variety of reasons, including budgetary constraints, the fact that Dead Set had to differentiate itself from Shaun of the Dead, as well as the plot requiring that the infection could put the entire country out of action before the producers had time to evacuate the studios. He also cited two George Romero films in which the zombies behaved non-traditionally, including a scene in the original Dawn of the Dead where two zombie children run.

Legacy
In 2013, Brooker confirmed that the Big Brother 14 production team sought his approval (which he granted) of a "quarantine" task inspired by Dead Set, which saw housemates being subjected to a fictional viral outbreak.

Steve Greene of IndieWire, reviewing the series in 2017, noted similar themes in Dead Set and Brooker's later series, Black Mirror. He described the former as "an analog precursor to the digital-themed entertainment" featured in the latter.

On April 24, 2019, the production of the Brazilian series Reality Z was announced, which was based on Dead Set. The show premiered on Netflix in 2020.

The COVID-19 pandemic, which saw contestants of Big Brother around the world being isolated from news of the pandemic before being released back into a world under lockdown, drew comparisons with Dead Set (albeit, with the COVID-19 disease instead of a fictional zombie virus). However, this did not happen with the UK edition of Big Brother, which was the edition of the show that Dead Set is based on. Big Brother UK (which moved from Channel 4 to Channel 5 in 2011) was cancelled in 2018, slightly under two years before the global pandemic began in 2020.

See alsoOne Cut of the Dead''

References

External links

 Official website. Archived on 2008-12-02
 

2008 British television series debuts
2008 British television series endings
2000s British horror television series
2000s British satirical television series
Big Brother (British TV series)
British horror comedy television series
British horror fiction television series
Channel 4 original programming
Reality television series parodies
Television series about television
Television series created by Charlie Brooker
Television series by Banijay
Television series by Zeppotron
Zombies in television